Strange Constellations is the first full-length studio album by the singer-songwriter William Matheny since the indefinite hiatus of Southeast Engine, released on February 17, 2017. It is his debut release on Misra Records.

Recording
The album was primarily recorded at Trackside Studio in Huntington, West Virginia. Additional recording took place at 3 Elliott Studio in Athens, Ohio, as well as Ronnie's Place and Electric Thunder, both in Nashville, Tennessee. It was produced and engineered by Bud Carroll (with additional engineering by Justin Francis), and mixed by Francis. Jeff Lipton mastered the album at Peerless Mastering in Boston, Massachusetts, along with assistant mastering engineer Maria Rice.

Release
The illustration on the album cover was drawn by Bryn Perrott, with graphic design by David Pokrivnak. The album was released by Misra Records on compact disc and a limited-edition silver foil vinyl record for the first run. After it sold out, the LP for the second run became a gold-foil inlaid package.

Reception

Daytrotter said of Matheny, "If you’re looking for your new favorite Americana rocker, look no further than the wonderful William Matheny," while 
comparing his sound favorably to The Jayhawks and Counting Crows. Additionally, "Living Half to Death" was chosen as a Heavy Rotation selection on NPR's Weekend Edition, stating that "Matheny has a knack for spinning stores about roach-infested apartments and social anxiety into indie gold.". Nashville Scene called it "a stout volume that folds some expert old-school storytelling into smart, nimble songs", while Paste praised it as "the perfect fusion of alt-country, rock, roots and pop."

Track listing
All songs written by William Matheny
"Teenage Bones" – 3:25
"God's Left Hand" – 3:29
"Out for Revenge" – 2:41
"Living Half to Death" – 4:01
"Blood Moon Singer" – 4:08
"My Grandfather Knew Stoney Cooper" – 5:13
"29 Candles" – 3:24
"Foolish of Me" – 3:16
"Funny Papers" – 3:15
"Man of Science" – 4:31
"(I Pray) You'll Miss Me When I'm Gone" – 3:26

Personnel
William Matheny – vocals, electric guitar, acoustic guitar, acoustic 12-string guitar, piano
Bud Carroll – drums, percussion, electric guitar, slide guitar, pedal steel, organ, vocals
Adam Meisterhans – bass, electric guitar, slide guitar, electric 12-string guitar, baritone guitar
Rod Elkins – percussion
Shane Keister – electric piano
Haley Slagle – vocals
Ian Thornton – bass 
Brad Goodall – synthesizer
Andrew Gillum – drums
Zachary Nichols – Gabriel's horn
Gabe Muncy – trumpet
Robert Galloway – saxophone
Tyler Grady – vocals
Corey Hatton – vocals 
Cody Hatton – vocals

References

External links
 Official Website

2017 albums
Rock albums